Veerapandi may refer to:
 Veerapandi, Coimbatore
 Veerapandi, Salem
 Veerapandi, Theni
 Veerapandi, Viluppuram